The Iuka Ravine Historic District is a historic district in the University District of Columbus, Ohio. The site was listed on the Columbus Register of Historic Properties in 1985 and the National Register of Historic Places in 1986. The district has approximately 50 houses and apartment buildings, most located on the edge of the wooded Iuka Ravine. The houses are mostly craftsman and early 20th century revival styles, with noted Columbus architects Frank Packard and Charles Inscho represented. The district was the first development in the city to take advantage of its natural landscape, setting an example for other early 20th century developments around Columbus.

See also
 National Register of Historic Places listings in Columbus, Ohio

References

National Register of Historic Places in Columbus, Ohio
Historic districts on the National Register of Historic Places in Ohio
1985 establishments in Ohio
Columbus Register properties
Historic districts in Columbus, Ohio